Simon-Apel (Hebrew: סימון-אפל) is a wealthy family, owners of the National Commercial Bank and one of the first families and investors of Tel Aviv.

Background 
Shlomo and his wife Rachel moved to Tel Aviv in 1909-1910. His son Eliezer was an engineer in Russia's train station. In 1908 Eliezer became sick and moved to Berlin in order to have medical assistance.
Four years later he died leaving behind his wife Tzila Simon Apel and 4 kids. Tzila decided to move to Israel in 1914 and live in Reines Street.
Due to the wealth of the family, they were one of the first families to build houses in Tel Aviv without taking any mortgage from the Jewish National Fund.

Shlomo and Rachel built two houses at Herzl 20 St (intersected with Yehuda Halevi 22 St).

The buying certificate was signed by the first mayor of Tel Aviv Meir Dizengoff.

Hannah Lichtenstein's daughter was Ala Simon, Samuel's Wife. She served in the Auxiliary Territorial Service in Alexandria, Egypt. Soon after Israel declaration she decided to join the Israel Defense Forces as an officer.

She was a Polyglot, speaking Hebrew, France, German, Russian and English.

Most of the family's early wealth came from International trade.

Investing in Tel Aviv 
After Samuel Simon completed his Economics degree at France, he decided to return to Israel in order to support the community of Tel Aviv. He was known as one of the best customers of the Anglo-Palestine Bank (Today known as Bank Leumi). However, soon after his degree completion he decided, together with his brother Aharon Simon, to fund the National Commercial Bank.

The purpose was to financially help new families to build their houses and live in Tel Aviv.

Notable Relatives 
Ala Simon's aunt Shoshana Avivit was a famous actress, she played in The Dybbuk and one of the 12 founders of Habima Theatre. She married Daniel Lecourtois

References 

Israeli families